In the aftermath of the Croatian Spring, 200–300 people were convicted of political crimes, but thousands more were imprisoned without formal charges for two to three months. Matica hrvatska was banned along with its 14 publications. Tens of thousands were expelled from the League of Communists of Croatia (Savez komunista Hrvatske, SKH), including 741 high-ranking officials including its leaders – Savka Dabčević-Kučar, Miko Tripalo, and Pero Pirker. Further 280 SKH members were compelled to resign their posts and 131 demoted. There were requests for a major show trial with Franjo Tuđman as the main defendant, but Yugoslav President Josip Broz Tito blocked the idea.

Dražen Budiša – student activist
 – student activist

Šime Đodan
Vlado Gotovac

Stjepan Mesić – later President of Croatia
Vlatko Pavletić – later Speaker of the Croatian Parliament
Ante Paradžik

Franjo Tuđman – later President of Croatia, convicted of attempts to topple the "democratic self-managing socialism"
Marko Veselica

References

Sources

Croatian Spring participants convicted of political crimes
Croatian Spring participants convicted of political crimes
Croatian Spring participants convicted of political crimes
Croatian Spring participants convicted of political crimes
Croatian Spring participants convicted of political crimes
Croatian Spring participants convicted of political crimes